Pharcoura is a genus of fly in the family Dolichopodidae from Chile. It is the first genus in the subfamily Medeterinae to be described from Nothofagus forests.

The generic name is a combination of the Greek words pharkis (wrinkle) and oura (tail).

Species
 Pharcoura biobio Bickel, 2007
 Pharcoura nahuelbuta Bickel, 2007
 Pharcoura newthayorum Bickel, 2007

References

Dolichopodidae genera
Medeterinae
Diptera of South America
Endemic fauna of Chile